Armoni Daetrell Brooks (born June 5, 1998) is an American professional basketball player for the College Park Skyhawks of the NBA G League. He played college basketball for the Houston Cougars.

College career
Brooks attended McNeil High School in Austin, Texas, where he played basketball. Lightly recruited out of high school, he enrolled at the University of Houston to play for the Houston Cougars men's basketball team under head coach Kelvin Sampson. As a junior, Brooks posted 13.4 points and 6.3 rebounds in 30.7 minutes per game. He was named to the All-AAC Second Team and All-AAC Tournament Team. Brooks declared for the 2019 NBA draft, and lost his final year of eligibility for college basketball. Prior to the draft, Brooks' shooting ability was considered his best asset.

Professional career

College Park Skyhawks (2019–2020)

After going undrafted in the 2019 NBA draft, Brooks played with the Washington Wizards in the 2019 NBA Summer League. In August 2019, he signed with the Atlanta Hawks, but was waived on October 18. He was subsequently rostered on the Hawks' NBA G League affiliate, the College Park Skyhawks. On January 24, 2020, Brooks scored a career-high 38 points against the Lakeland Magic and four days later, he scored 32 points against the Rio Grande Valley Vipers. Throughout the season, he averaged 10.7 points and 3.4 rebounds for the Skyhawks.

On April 20, 2020, Brooks signed with the Saskatchewan Rattlers of the Canadian Elite Basketball League. However, he never played for the Rattlers, as he sat out the season due to the COVID-19 pandemic.

Rio Grande Valley Vipers (2021)
On January 11, 2021, Brooks was selected by the Rio Grande Valley Vipers in the first round of the NBA G League draft. In 15 games during the G League hub season, he averaged 16.8 points, 3.7 rebounds, 3.0 assists, and 1.07 steals while leading the G League in 3-pointers made (57), averaging 3.8 on 37.5 percent shooting.

Houston Rockets (2021–2022)
On April 3, 2021, Brooks signed a two-way contract with the Vipers' NBA affiliate, the Houston Rockets. He scored a career-high 24 points in a May 12 loss to the Los Angeles Lakers.

On August 27, 2021, Brooks re-signed with the Rockets on a four-year contract. He was waived on February 10, 2022.

Return to College Park (2022)
On February 27, 2022, Brooks was re-acquired by the College Park Skyhawks.

Toronto Raptors (2022)
On March 6, 2022, Brooks signed a 10-day contract with the Toronto Raptors. On March 16, he signed a second 10-day contract. On March 26, he signed a two-year deal with the Raptors. He was waived on July 30, 2022.

Third stint with College Park (2022–present)
On November 4, 2022, Brooks was named to the opening roster for the College Park Skyhawks.

Career statistics

NBA

Regular season

|-
| style="text-align:left;"| 
| style="text-align:left;"| Houston
| 20 || 5 || 26.0 || .406 || .382 || .583 || 3.4 || 1.5 || .6 || .3 || 11.2
|-
| style="text-align:left;"| 
| style="text-align:left;"| Houston
| 41 || 8 || 16.8 || .347 || .300 || .842 || 2.0 || 1.2 || .5 || .2 || 6.2
|-
| style="text-align:left;"| 
| style="text-align:left;"| Toronto
| 13 || 3 || 11.8 || .289 || .278 || 1.000 || 1.7 || 1.0 || .5 || .2 || 2.6
|- class="sortbottom"
| style="text-align:center;" colspan="2"| Career
| 74 || 16 || 18.4 || .366 || .330 || .758 || 2.3 || 1.2 || .5 || .2 || 6.9

Playoffs

|-
| style="text-align:left;"|2022
| style="text-align:left;"|Toronto
| 4 || 0 || 2.0 || .000 || .000 || — || .5 || .0 || .0 || .0 || .0
|- class="sortbottom"
| style="text-align:center;" colspan="2"|Career
| 4 || 0 || 2.0 || .000 || .000 || — || .5 || .0 || .0 || .0 || .0

College

|-
| style="text-align:left;"| 2016–17
| style="text-align:left;"| Houston
| 28 || 3 || 12.2 || .433 || .362 || .800 || 2.3 || .3 || .4 || .1 || 4.4
|-
| style="text-align:left;"| 2017–18
| style="text-align:left;"| Houston
| 35 || 1 || 20.1 || .425 || .419 || .815 || 3.7 || .5 || .7 || .3 || 9.3
|-
| style="text-align:left;"| 2018–19
| style="text-align:left;"| Houston
| 37 || 36 || 30.7 || .405 || .390 || .630 || 6.3 || .9 || .8 || .3 || 13.4
|- class="sortbottom"
| style="text-align:center;" colspan="2"| Career
| 100 || 40 || 21.8 || .415 || .397 || .711 || 4.3 || .6 || .7 || .3 || 9.4

References

External links
Houston Cougars bio

1998 births
Living people
American expatriate basketball people in Canada
American men's basketball players
Basketball players from Texas
College Park Skyhawks players
Houston Cougars men's basketball players
Houston Rockets players
Rio Grande Valley Vipers players
Shooting guards
Sportspeople from Waco, Texas
Toronto Raptors players
Undrafted National Basketball Association players